Golf at the 2015 Southeast Asian Games were held in Sentosa Golf Club, Singapore from 9 to 12 June 2015. Four competitions were held: both men and women's individual and team.

Participating nations
A total of 56 athletes from 10 nations competed in golf at the 2015 Southeast Asian Games:

Competition schedule
The following is the competition schedule for the golf competitions:

Medalists

Medal table

References

External links
 

2015 Southeast Asian Games
2015
2015 Southeast Asian Games events